Bangweulu is a constituency of the National Assembly of Zambia. It covers an area to the south of Lake Bangweulu in Samfya District, including the town of Samfya, in Luapula Province.

List of MPs

References

Constituencies of the National Assembly of Zambia
1962 establishments in Northern Rhodesia
Constituencies established in 1962